John Albert Chamberlain Kefford (5 June 1905 – 24 May 1996) was an English actor professionally known as John Abbott. His memorable roles include the invalid Frederick Fairlie in the 1948 film The Woman in White and the pacifist Ayelborne in the Star Trek episode "Errand of Mercy". He also played Sesmar on an episode of Lost in Space, "The Dream Monster", in 1966. Abbott was known as a Shakespearean actor.

Biography
Abbott was born in the district of Stepney in London on 5 June 1905. He had two siblings - a sister, Ivy Skeates of Cambridge, and a brother, Harold Kefford.

In 1934, he began his career in show business when he made his professional stage debut in a revival of Dryden's Aureng-zebe with Sybil Thorndike. He then joined the Old Vic Company and appeared in Shakespearean roles, including Claudius in a production of Hamlet at Elsinore Castle in Denmark with Laurence Olivier, Vivien Leigh, and Alec Guinness. His first Broadway role was that of Count Mancini in He Who Gets Slapped in 1946. He also appeared on Broadway in Monserrat and The Waltz of the Toreadors.  He made his film debut in Mademoiselle Docteur in 1937, and went on to act in scores of films in the next 30 years. Among his film credits are Mission to Moscow, Jane Eyre, A Thousand and One Nights, Humoresque, and The Greatest Story Ever Told.  His television appearances in that time were even more numerous, beginning with pioneering broadcasts by the BBC before the Second World War.

In the early days of the Second World War, Abbott worked at the British Embassy in Stockholm. When the time came to leave, he had to go by way of the United States. While in the U.S., he was offered a part in Hollywood in 1941 and ended up living there for the rest of his life.

On American television between the 1950s and 1970s, Abbott had roles on a wide variety of series such as Kraft Television Theatre, Studio 57, Gunsmoke, Matinee Theatre, Bonanza, Thriller, Star Trek, Mannix, Iron Horse, and Bewitched. Although he was blacklisted during the Red Scare of the 1950s, a producer who wanted to hire him eventually succeeded in getting the actor removed from the list. In his final years, Abbott taught acting to students free of charge.

Abbott died at Cedars-Sinai Medical Center from natural causes on 24 May 1996 at the age of 90.

Filmography

References

External links

 
 

1905 births
1996 deaths
British emigrants to the United States
English male film actors
English male television actors
English male voice actors
Male actors from London
English male Shakespearean actors
English male stage actors
20th-century English male actors
People from Stepney